Piamonte is a town and municipality in the Cauca Department, Colombia.

Piamonte was founded in 1959 as a district of the municipality of Santa Rosa. Its inhabitants are settlers from various regions of the interior of Colombia that have been established there in successive migrations attracted initially by the quinine bonanza in the 1930s, displaced by the violence in the 1950s and 1960s and finally attracted by the oil fever. There are also members of the Inga indigenous community. Piamonte was declared as municipality in 1996.

History 
The town of Piamonte was established 1959 by a group of settlers led by Aristides Perez in a site known at the time as La Barbasca. In the year 1966, some leaders of the area, including Bosco Arcos, José Antonio Hurtado, Gustavo Pérez and Arístides Pérez among others, proposed the separation of the Piamonte from the municipality of Santa Rosa; this proposal materilized years later as result of the incursion of several petroleum companies in the regions in the early 1990s.
Piamonte was recognized as a municipality under ordinance 024 of November 18, 1996.

Climate 
Piamonte has a tropical rainforest climate (Köppen Af) with hot temperatures, high humidity and heavy to very heavy rainfall year-round.

Places of interest 

The Serranía de Los Churumbelos Auka-Wasi National Natural Park located in the mountainous part of the municipality.

References

Municipalities of Cauca Department
Populated places on the Amazon